Prince Dhirendra Bir Bikram Shah Dev of Nepal (4 Jan 1950 – 1 June 2001) was the youngest son of King Mahendra of Nepal and his first wife, Crown Princess Indra.

Education

He studied with his brothers King Birendra and King Gyanendra in St. Joseph's College, Darjeeling, India; and in 1969, he graduated from Tribhuvan University, Kathmandu.

Life
His mother Indra died due to birth complications.

Prince Dhirendra was often described as the "wayward" one among Mahendra's sons. He was described as fun-loving, generous, and kind. When he was in school, he was greatly interested in theater. Prince Dhirendra was also greatly interested in sports. He had a black belt (2 Dan) in Judo from Kodokan Judo Institute, Japan. He was also a chief scout of Nepal and patron of the National Sports Council. In 1987, he was the chairman of the National Youth Services Foundation. In 1974, he represented the king at the coronation of Bhutanese King Jigme Singye Wangchuck.

Prince Dhirendra renounced his title of Prince and the style of His Royal Highness because of his relationship with a foreigner in December 1987. After that, he lived in England until he returned to Nepal in 1998.

Marriages and family

On May 13, 1973, he married his second cousin (and the sister of the wives of his brothers, Queen Aishwarya and Queen Komal), Princess Prekshya (19 January 1956 – 12 Nov 2001). From this marriage, he had three daughters:

 Princess Puja Rajya Lakshmi Devi (b. 1977).
 Princess Dilasha Rajya Lakshmi Devi (b. 11 May 1979).
 Princess Sitashma Rajya Lakshmi Devi (b. 1981).

In the 1980s, he divorced his first wife.

Death

Dhirendra was killed in the palace massacre at Narayanhiti Royal Palace, during one of his rare visits to the country. He was due to regain his title and place in the line of succession.

Styles
1950 - 1972: His Royal Highness Sri Panch Adhirajkumar Dhirendra Bir Bikram Shah Deva.
1972 - 1986: Colonel His Royal Highness Suprasidha-Prabala-Gorkha-Dakshina-Bahu Sri Panch Adhirajkumar Dhirendra Bir Bikram Shah Deva.
1986 - 1987: Colonel His Royal Highness Suprasidha-Prabala-Gorkha-Dakshina-Bahu Sri Panch Adhirajkumar Sir Dhirendra Bir Bikram Shah Deva, GCMG.
1987 - 2001: Suprasidha-Prabala-Gorkha-Dakshina-Bahu Sir Dhirendra Bir Bikram Shah Deva, GCMG.

Honours
2 May 1956: King Mahendra Coronation Medal.
1972: Order of the Gurkha Right Hand, 1st class (Suprasidha-Prabala-Gorkha-Dakshina-Bahu).
24 February 1975: King Birendra Coronation Medal.
17 February 1986: Knight Grand Cross of the Order of St Michael and St George (GCMG).
24 February 1997: Commemorative Silver Jubilee Medal of King Birendra.

Ancestry

References 

1950 births
2001 deaths
2001 murders in Asia
 Murdered royalty
 Nepalese murder victims
 Knights Grand Cross of the Order of St Michael and St George
 Members of the Order of Gorkha Dakshina Bahu, First Class
 Nepalese royalty
 Tribhuvan University alumni
 People murdered in Nepal
 Nepalese princes
20th-century Nepalese nobility
Nepalese Hindus